Aquadynia is a variant of aquagenic pruritus, and is characterized by a widespread burning pain that lasts 15 to 45 minutes after water exposure.

See also 
 Aquagenic pruritus
 Pruritus
 Skin lesion

References

Pruritic skin conditions